Stephanie Dorothea Christine Wehner  (born 8 May 1977 in Würzburg) is a German physicist and computer scientist.

She is the Roadmap Leader of the Quantum Internet and Networked Computing initiative  at QuTech, Delft University of Technology. She is also known for introducing the noisy-storage model in quantum cryptography. Wehner's research focuses mainly on quantum cryptography and quantum communications.

Wehner, together with Jonathan Oppenheim, discovered that the amount of non-locality in quantum mechanics is limited by the uncertainty principle.

Education and early life 
She studied at the University of Amsterdam and obtained her Ph.D. at CWI. Following this she moved to Caltech as a postdoctoral researcher (under John Preskill).

Wehner was involved in computer security, for example kernel rootkits, and worked as a professional hacker.

Research 
From 2010 to 2014, Wehner was an assistant professor and later associate professor at the department of computer science at the National University of Singapore and a Principal Investigator at the Centre for Quantum Technologies. In 2014, she started as associate professor at QuTech, Delft University of Technology and as of 2016 she is  Antoni van Leeuwenhoek professor at the Delft University of Technology.

QCRYPT conference 
In 2011, Wehner and others founded the QCRYPT conference series. The latest conference was organised in the Shanghai International Conference Center, Shanghai.

Quantum Internet Alliance 
Stephanie Wehner is the coordinator of the Quantum Internet Alliance which was awarded ten million Euros in October 2018 by the European Commission. Commenting on the award, Wehner said: "This grant allows us to speed up in order to keep Europe at the front of this fascinating field of research and technology development”.

Publications 
Her publications include:

 Oppenheim, Jonathan, and Stephanie Wehner. "The uncertainty principle determines the nonlocality of quantum mechanics." Science 330.6007 (2010): 1072–1074.
Hensen, Bas, et al. "Loophole-free Bell inequality violation using electron spins separated by 1.3 kilometres." Nature526.7575 (2015): 682.

Awards 
Ammodo Science Award in 2019

References

1977 births
21st-century German physicists
21st-century German women scientists
Academic staff of the Delft University of Technology
German computer criminals
German computer scientists
German women physicists
Living people
Scientists from Würzburg
University of Amsterdam alumni
German women computer scientists